The 13th American Handball Championship, also called PanAmericano 2008, was the 13th edition of the Pan American Men's Handball Championship, held from 24 to 28 June 2008 in São Carlos, Brazil. It also acted as the qualifying competition for the 2009 World Men's Handball Championship, securing three vacancies for the World Championship. These places were earned by Brazil, Argentina and Cuba.

Eight nations had been scheduled to play at the tournament, but Dominican Republic decided not to play just a few days before the tournament, so Group B had only three participating teams.

Preliminary round
All times are local (UTC−9).

All times are (UTC-3)

Group A

Group B

Knockout stage

Bracket

Fifth place bracket

5–7th place semifinal

Semifinals

Fifth place game

Third place game

Final

Final ranking

Top goalscorers

External links

Results at todor66.com

2008
2008 in handball
2008 in Brazilian sport
Pan
Pan